The Gold Dome is a 3,000-seat multi-purpose arena on the campus of Centenary College of Louisiana in Shreveport, Louisiana. It was built in 1970.  It is home to the Centenary Gentlemen basketball team, Centenary Ladies basketball team, volleyball team and gymnastics team.

Construction

The Gold Dome is a rare project built entirely by private funds (minus construction financing, for a US$19 million construction cost).

Its only significant structural element is the raised dome section which must be closed off before the entire structure can be lowered into place.

Gold Dome was built at the insistence of the Louisiana Forum Foundation, which granted it a tax-exempt charter in 1967.

References

External links
Gold Dome

Centenary Gentlemen basketball
Centenary Ladies basketball
Centenary Ladies volleyball
Centenary Ladies gymnastics
Basketball venues in Louisiana
College basketball venues in the United States
College gymnastics venues in the United States
College volleyball venues in the United States
Gymnastics venues in Louisiana
Indoor arenas in Louisiana
Sports venues in Shreveport, Louisiana
Volleyball venues in Louisiana 
Sports venues completed in 1970
1970 establishments in Louisiana